The 1978 Gulf British League season was the 44th season of the top tier of speedway in the United Kingdom and the 14th season known as the British League.

Summary
The list of nineteen teams that competed in the league was identical to the previous season. The league was sponsored by Gulf Oil for a fourth season. 

Coventry Bees won their second title and their first for ten years. Belle Vue Aces were runners-up for the fourth time in five seasons and would receive a double blow when losing in the final of the Knockout Cup. Two time world champion Ole Olsen was in sensational form for Coventry and made the difference throughout the season. Olsen would also seal his third world individual crown by the end of the season. The Coventry side consisted of an array of overseas riders including Olsen and fellow Dane Alf Busk, New Zealander Mitch Shirra, Australian Gary Guglielmi and Jiří Štancl from Czechoslovakia.

League table
M = Matches; W = Wins; D = Draws; L = Losses; Pts = Total Points

British League Knockout Cup
The 1978 Speedway Star British League Knockout Cup was the 40th edition of the Knockout Cup for tier one teams. Ipswich Witches were the winners.

First round

Second round

Quarter-finals

Semi-finals

Final

First leg

Second leg

Ipswich were declared Knockout Cup Champions, winning on aggregate 92-64.

Leading final averages

Riders & final averages
Belle Vue

 10.41
 10.11
 8.00
 7.73
 4.90
 4.52
 4.45
 4.36
 4.30
 1.14

Birmingham

 8.56
 8.30
 6.80
 6.66
 5.05
 4.94
 4.31
 4.17

Bristol

 9.92
 9.15
 7.29
 5.90
 5.32
 5.12
 4.69
 4.49
 3.65
 3.48

Coventry

 10.56
 9.49
 7.85
 6.23
 6.07
 5.60
 4.94
 4.24
 2.86

Cradley Heath

 9.51
 9.26
 8.21
 6.56
 6.22
 5.44
 5.23
 5.22
 5.05
 3.68

Exeter

 10.40
 8.44
 8.35 
 7.01
 6.75
 6.09
 6.06
 5.86

Hackney

 7.70
 6.70
 6.54
 6.28
 6.14
 5.27
 5.24
 4.00
 3.65
 1.60

Halifax

 8.35 
 8.06
 7.45
 6.19
 5.98
 5.83
 5.40
 4.81

Hull

 9.77 
 9.06
 7.26
 7.01
 6.74
 6.63
 6.49
 5.04
 2.33

Ipswich

 9.94 
 9.60
 9.03 
 6.82
 4.79
 4.40
 3.94
 3.09

King's Lynn

 10.23
 8.10
 7.01
 5.93
 5.79
 4.44
 4.35
 3.57
 3.37
 3.30
 2.09

Leicester

 8.94
 8.70 
 8.41 
 4.94
 4.84
 4.47
 4.33
 3.06
 2.12
 2.00

Poole

 10.77
 7.67
 7.25
 6.46
 6.03
 6.00
 5.62
 4.51
 3.36

Reading

 10.20 
 8.93
 5.91
 5.90
 4.53
 4.00
 3.69
 2.94
 2.56

Sheffield

 9.35
 8.59 
 6.93
 6.65
 6.45 
 3.35
 3.20
 2.94
 2.53

Swindon

 8.44
 8.05
 7.68
 6.55
 4.39
 4.00
 3.17
 2.42
 2.29
 1.88
 1.60

White City

 9.52
 7.17
 6.67
 5.48
 5.16
 5.05
 4.95
 4.66

Wimbledon

 9.29
 8.61
 7.82
 7.26
 6.67
 6.53
 6.46
 3.56

Wolverhampton

 8.85
 8.58
 8.58
 4.37
 3.87
 3.70
 3.62
 2.56

See also
List of United Kingdom Speedway League Champions
Knockout Cup (speedway)

References

British League
1978 in British motorsport
1978 in speedway